Lê Viết Lam is a Vietnamese businessman, entrepreneur, and property developer. He is the founder of Sun Group Vietnam.

Biography
Lê Viết Lam was born in 1969 in Hoằng Quang commune, Hoằng Hóa district, Thanh Hóa province.

In 1987, after studying for a year at the Faculty of Textile Energy Engineering at Hanoi University of Science and Technology, he was sent to Russia to study and obtained a master's degree in 1992.

In 1993, he and Phạm Nhật Vượng, together with a group of young people, established the Barabarosha market.

Later, Lam and Vượng founded Technocom company. Initially, the company sold instant noodles under the brand name Mivina. Technocom then became a market leader in dehydrated culinary products in Ukraine, before being sold to Nestlé in 2009.

While Vượng remained with Technocom for a while before returning to Vietnam to found Vingroup, Lam and a few partners soon left the company to establish Sun Group in 2007.

See also
 Phạm Nhật Vượng

References

Vietnamese businesspeople
1969 births
Living people
Vietnamese business executives
Vietnamese company founders
Real estate and property developers
People from Thanh Hóa province